The San Francisco Municipal Railway (Muni) is the public transit system for San Francisco, California. Several bus, trolleybus, streetcar/light rail, and cable car routes were historically served, but have been discontinued. It began service on December 28, 1912, with two streetcar routes on Geary Boulevard and continued to expand operations. In 1944, the city acquired the largest remaining private transit agency in San Francisco, the Market Street Railway, and began operating its former services. Many modern routes are amalgamated from earlier lines, while some corridors no longer see regular Muni service.

Defunct bus lines 
This is a listing of all the Local, Rapid, Express, and streetcar lines that once operated throughout San Francisco, but are now defunct.

Local lines

Limited/Rapid lines

Express lines

Candlestick Park lines 
Through the end of 2013, the four Candlestick Express lines connected Candlestick Park with other points throughout the city. These lines ran before and after San Francisco 49ers games, while the 86 and 87 Candlestick Shuttles also ran during the game.

R Howard
The R Howard was a trolleybus line created on September 7, 1941. It ran from Beale and Howard on Howard and South Van Ness Avenue to Army Street (now Cesar Chavez Street). It was combined with the E Union in July 1947, and was renumbered 41 in February 1949.

Defunct streetcar routes

A Geary-10th Avenue
The A Geary-10th Avenue was Muni's first streetcar line, running from Market Street and Kearny Street, and later from the Ferry Building, along Geary and 10th Avenue to Fulton Street. The route was discontinued on December 5, 1932. In 2009, part of the route was under study to be restored as bus rapid transit and possibly as a streetcar route.

B Geary
The B Geary (also known as the B Geary-Ocean) was a streetcar route that operated along Market Street and Geary Boulevard to the Playland amusement park along Ocean Beach. It originally ran as a shuttle between 10th Avenue and 33rd Avenue, and was later extended east along Geary and Market Street to the Ferry Building to the east, and along 33rd Avenue, Balboa, 45th Avenue and Cabrillo to Great Highway to the west. The line was replaced with the 38 Geary bus route on December 29, 1956.

There are plans to construct a light rail corridor on Geary Boulevard between Van Ness Avenue and 33rd Avenue. Funding has not been identified to build rail in this corridor, however it was identified as a Tier 1 Long Term Corridor Investment (the highest priority) in 2016.

C Geary-California
The C California (also known as the C Geary-California) was a streetcar route that ran from the Ferry Building along Market Street, Geary, 2nd Avenue, Cornwall, and California to 33rd Avenue. The route was cut short in 1950 to California and 2nd Avenue with the opening of the 1 California bus line, and was removed along with the B Geary on December 29, 1956. In 2009, part of the route was under study to be restored for Bus Rapid Transit.

This route was created shortly after the Market Street Railway's franchise expired on California street. By 1950, the line was essentially a short-turn version of the B Geary streetcar route, which continued out to Ocean Beach.

D Geary-Van Ness
The D Geary-Van Ness was a streetcar route created on August 15, 1914 that originally ran from the Ferry Building along Market Street, Geary, Van Ness, and Chestnut to Scott. In 1918, the route was changed to operate on Union Street instead of Chestnut, and was extended along Steiner Street and Greenwich Street and into the Presidio later that year.

The route was replaced with buses on March 18, 1950 and renamed the 45 Greenwich. This was one of four routes planned as a result of the 1915 Panama–Pacific International Exposition. In 2009, parts of the Geary and Van Ness Corridors it once traveled were up for study for Bus Rapid Transit, and possibly, restoration of light rail transit in the area.

E Union
The E Union was a streetcar route that ran from the Ferry Building to the Presidio via The Embarcadero, Washington/Jackson, Columbus, Union, Larkin, Vallejo, Franklin, Union, Baker and Greenwich into the Presidio. The route was replaced on July 20, 1947, by an extension of the R-Howard trolleybus route, which in turn was renumbered 41-Union on February 1, 1949. The 41-Union still runs today. It was reduced to rush-hour service on October 1, 1988. This was one of four routes planned as a result of the 1915 Panama–Pacific International Exposition. Today, the E designation is used for the E Embarcadero historic streetcar route.

F Stockton
The F Stockton was a streetcar route that ran from Market and Stockton to the Marina District via Stockton, Columbus, North Point, Van Ness, and Chestnut to Laguna. The Stockton Street Tunnel, opened in 1914, was built primarily for these streetcars. In 1916, the line was extended from Chestnut and Laguna to Chestnut and Scott, and was extended in 1947 from Market and Stockton down 4th Street to the Southern Pacific terminal on Townsend. The route was replaced on January 20, 1951, with the 30 Stockton bus route, which still runs today, and is notable for being the slowest trolleybus route in the city of San Francisco because it travels through the densely populated neighborhood of Chinatown. This was one of four routes planned as a result of the 1915 Panama–Pacific International Exposition. , the F designation is used for the F Market & Wharves historic streetcar route.

The southernmost part of this route, from Market to Jackson, is once again served by light rail by the T Third Street after the Central Subway was opened. A further extension of the line may replace the rest of the present 30 Stockton bus line extending to the Presidio, depending on where the eventual exit from the subway tunnel is placed.

H Potrero
The H Potrero streetcar line was created on August 15, 1914, to serve the Panama-Pacific International exposition. It ran from Army Street (Now Cesar Chavez Street) and Potrero to a terminal inside Fort Mason, via Potrero, Division, 11th Street and Van Ness. In 1946 the line was extended along former Market Street Railway trackage on Bayshore and San Bruno to Arleta. The southern terminal was cut back to San Bruno and Wilde in 1947, and in 1948 the northern terminal was cut back to Van Ness and Bay. The route was replaced on March 19, 1950, with the 47 Potrero bus line. The 47 line has since been changed and no longer runs on Potrero, and the only bus line that follows the old H line is the nighttime-only 90 Owl.

The Van Ness Bus Rapid Transit line began operation in 2022; it was constructed by the San Francisco County Transportation Authority. A feasibility study was conducted in 2006, followed by a draft Environmental Impact Statement in 2011. A Locally Preferred Alternative was selected in early 2012. A Final EIS was expected in 2012, along with Caltrans approval. Construction began in 2016. The SFCTA currently does not have plans to revive the H-Potrero streetcar line.

40 San Mateo

The 40 San Mateo was a  interurban route that provided service along The Peninsula from 1903 to 1949. Previous service under the San Francisco and San Mateo Electric Railway only reached as far as Baden in South San Francisco. After being bought and sold several times, the line came under the ownership of the United Railroads of San Francisco, under whom it was finally built out to San Mateo with service starting on December 31, 1902. The northern terminus was at Fifth and Market whereupon it ran on city streets (mostly Mission Street), then on a largely private right-of-way to a terminal in San Mateo. Service was discontinued as the trackage and rolling stock had fallen into disrepair by the mid 1940s.

Temporary routes
The G Exposition, I Exposition, and J Exposition were temporary  streetcar lines that were created in 1915 and 1916 to serve the Panama–Pacific International Exposition. The G line was a combination of the E and F routes, running from Market and Stockton to the Presidio. The I line only ran  for three days in February 1915, from 33rd Avenue and Geary via Geary, Van Ness, Chestnut, Scott, Greenwich and Steiner to Union. The J line, which is unrelated to the current J Church line, ran via Columbus from the Ferry Building to Fort Mason and later to Chestnut and Scott.

The O Van Ness line operated briefly between June 1, 1932 and July 15, 1932, along part of the E Union from Van Ness and Union to the Ferry Building. During this time, the E line ran down Van Ness to Market instead of to the Ferry Building.

The E Embarcadero line operated between Embarcadero station and 4th and King over the new Muni Metro Extension from January 1998 until August 1998, when it was merged into an extension of the N Judah line. The name was reused for an unrelated heritage streetcar line in 2015.

Defunct cable car routes
Note: Before 1956, the California Street Line extended all the way from Market Street in the Financial District to California and Presidio Avenue on the western edge of the Western Addition.

See also
San Francisco Historic Trolley Festival
List of San Francisco Municipal Railway lines
Muni Metro
E Embarcadero
F Market & Wharves

References

Bibliography

External links
 San Francisco Municipal Transportation Agency (SFMTA) official website
 San Francisco Transportation Authority (SFCTA) official website
 Streetcars: The A Line - Western Neighborhoods Project - San Francisco History info and photos
 Streetcars: The B Geary-Ocean Line - Western Neighborhoods Project - San Francisco History info and photos
 Streetcars: The C Geary-California Line - Western Neighborhoods Project - San Francisco History info and photos

San Francisco Municipal Railway
San Francisco
San Francisco
San Francisco
Muni
Light rail in California
San Francisco